Sailo Jharapada is a small village situated beside the river Devi (Kathajodi), a branch of the river Mahanadi. It is in the Kantapada block of Cuttack district, Odisha, India. Name of the village is Jharapada, SAILO is the name of the pragana used as a prefix to identify the village from other places with same name. PIN code is 754003. Besides the river Devi Kakatapur Branch canal also flows on eastern side of the village by the side of the river. The village is under NIALI assembly constituency under Jagatsinghpur parliamentary constituency.

Freedom Fighters
This village had multiple members who participated in India's Independence Movement. 
Ramachandra Mohapatra
Sarbani Narayan Sengupta
Baishnaba Charan Senapati
Shyamananda Mohapatra
Padmacharan Mohapatra

From nearby village
Bibhuti bhusan Acharya - Brahman Sailo
Ishwar Chandra Pradhan - Bada Waubarai
Bauribandhu Patra - Majurai
Ghanashyam Pati - Govindpur
Muralidhar Kanungo - Uttaran
Haramani Kanungo - Uttaran 
Kanduri Charan Mallik - Alingi
Bijayram Chaoudhury - Patasundarpur.
Balaram Choudhury - Patasundarpur
Gangadhar Mishra-Bhodal

Religion
The only and major religion of this village is Hindu. This village has signs of various rulers of Odisha, who have followed Vishnu, Shiva, Shakti. Accordingly, the village has various temples created in different centuries

Temples
Bhogeshwar This is the oldest temple in the village. The temple was initially constructed in 18th century.
Laxmi Narayan New idol installed in May 2013.
Jagannath This temple was built by Rabi Narayan Mohapatra. He also started Rathayatra in 2015 with co-operation of the devotees.
Budhi Thakurani
Akhandalamani
Hanuman

Festivals
Dasahara is a major festival. Other festivals include Ganesh Chaturthi, Kali Puja, Kartika Puja, Jagannath rathayatra was held for the first time in July-2015.

Education

Schools
The village has old educational institutions in the area.
A primary school started functioning in the year 1904. In 1941 ME School was established. High school was established in the year 1956.

Bank
Canara Bank has opened a branch in the village.
IFS Code is CNRB0004972.
Branch ID 004972

Cities and towns in Cuttack district